Fritz Erich Fellgiebel (4 October 1886 – 4 September 1944) was a German Army general of signals and resistance fighter in the 20 July plot to assassinate Nazi dictator Adolf Hitler. In 1929, Fellgiebel became head of the cipher bureau of the Ministry of the Reichswehr, which would later become the OKW/Chi. He was a signals specialist and was instrumental in introducing a common enciphering machine, the Enigma machine. However, he was unsuccessful in promoting a single cipher agency to coordinate all operations, as was demanded by OKW/Chi and was still blocked by Joachim von Ribbentrop, Heinrich Himmler and Hermann Göring  until autumn 1943. It was not achieved until General Albert Praun took over the post.

Military career
Fellgiebel was born in Pöpelwitz (Present-day Popowice in Wrocław, Poland) in the Prussian Province of Silesia. At the age of 18, he joined a signals battalion in the Prussian Army as an officer cadet. During the First World War, he served as a captain on the General Staff. After the war he was assigned to Berlin as a General Staff officer of the Reichswehr. His service had been exemplary, and in 1928 he was promoted to the rank of major.

Fellgiebel was promoted lieutenant colonel in 1933, and became a full colonel (Oberst) the following year. By 1938, he was a major general. That year, he was appointed Chief of the Army's Signal Establishment and Chief of the Wehrmachts communications liaison to the Supreme Command (OKW). Fellgiebel became General der Nachrichtentruppe (General of the Communications Troops) on 1 August 1940.

In 1942, Fellgiebel was promoted to Chief Signal Officer of Army High Command and of Supreme Command of Armed Forces, a position he held until 1944 when he was arrested.

Adolf Hitler did not fully trust Fellgiebel; Hitler considered him too independent-minded, but Hitler needed Fellgiebel's expertise. Fellgiebel was one of the first to understand that the German military should adopt and use the Enigma encryption machine. As head of Hitler's signal services, Fellgiebel knew every military secret, including Wernher von Braun's rocketry work at the Peenemünde Army Research Center.

Resistance activities
Through his acquaintance with Colonel General Ludwig Beck, his superior, and then Beck's successor, Colonel-General Franz Halder, Fellgiebel contacted the anti-Nazi resistance group in the Wehrmacht armed forces. In the 1938 September Conspiracy on the eve of the Munich Agreement, he was supposed to cut communications throughout Germany while Field Marshal Erwin von Witzleben would occupy Berlin.

He was a key source for the Red Orchestra. Fellgiebel released classified German military information to Rudolf Roessler (codename "Lucy" of the Lucy spy ring) about Operation Citadel which allowed Soviet forces to deploy effectively.

Fellgiebel was involved in the preparations for Operation Valkyrie and during the attempt on the Führers life on 20 July 1944 tried to cut Hitler's headquarters at Wolf's Lair in East Prussia off from all telecommunication connections. He only partly succeeded, as he could not prevent the informing of Joseph Goebbels in Berlin via separate SS links. When it became clear that the attempt had failed, Fellgiebel had to override the communications black-out he had set up. Fellgiebel's most famous act that day was his telephone report to his co-conspirator General Fritz Thiele at the Bendlerblock, after he was informed that Hitler was still alive: "Etwas Furchtbares ist passiert! Der Führer lebt!" ("Something awful has happened! The Führer lives!").

Fellgiebel was arrested immediately at Wolf's Lair and tortured for three weeks, but did not reveal any names of his co-conspirators.  He was charged before the Volksgerichtshof ("People's Court"). On 10 August 1944, he was found guilty by Roland Freisler and sentenced to death. He was executed on 4 September 1944 at Plötzensee Prison in Berlin.

Memorials
The Bundeswehrs barracks, Information Technology School of the Bundeswehr ("Schule Informationstechnik der Bundeswehr") in Pöcking, is named the General-Fellgiebel-Kaserne in his honour.

Awards and decorations
 Iron Cross of 1914, 1st and 2nd class
 Clasp to the Iron Cross, 1st and 2nd class
 Honour Cross of the World War 1914/1918
 Ottoman War Medal (Turkish: Harp Madalyası, "Gallipoli Star" or "Iron Crescent ")
 Military Merit Order, 4th class with Swords (Bavaria)
 Military Merit Cross, 3rd class with War Decoration (Austria-Hungary)
 Officer's Cross of the Order of Military Merit (Bulgaria)

See also
 List of members of the 20 July plot
 Lucy spy ring

References

Literature
 Brown, Anthony Cave, Bodyguard of Lies, Harper & Row, 1975.
 Macksey, Kenneth: Without Enigma: the Ultra & Fellgiebel riddles.  Shepperton: Allan, 2000. – .
 Stahlberg, Alexander, Bounden Duty: The Memoirs of a German Officer 1932-45, 1990.
 Wildhagen, Karl Heinz (Hrsg.): Erich Fellgiebel, Meister operativer Nachrichtenverbindungen. – Wenningsen: Selbstverl., 1970.

Sources
 Account of the Operation (in German)
 Linked German article
 Brief article about Fellgiebel

External links
 

1886 births
1944 deaths
History of telecommunications in Germany
People from Wrocław County
People from the Province of Silesia
Executed members of the 20 July plot
Executions at Plötzensee Prison
German Army personnel of World War I
Prussian Army personnel
Generals of Signal Troops
Recipients of the clasp to the Iron Cross, 1st class
Officers of the Order of Military Merit (Bulgaria)
People condemned by Nazi courts
Executed military leaders
German people executed by Nazi Germany